M. S. Prabhu is an Indian cinematographer who works mainly in the Tamil film industry. He started his career as an assistant to P. C. Sreeram before starting as an independent cinematographer.

Filmography

As cinematographer

References

External links

Living people
Hindi film cinematographers
Place of birth missing (living people)
Year of birth missing (living people)
Tamil film cinematographers
Telugu film cinematographers